Annie Caron (born 10 August 1941) is a French former butterfly and freestyle swimmer. She competed in three events at the 1960 Summer Olympics.

References

External links
 

1941 births
Living people
French female butterfly swimmers
French female freestyle swimmers
Olympic swimmers of France
Swimmers at the 1960 Summer Olympics
Swimmers from Paris